Events in the year 1884 in Norway.

Incumbents
Monarch: Oscar II
Prime Minister: Christian August Selmer (impeached)
Prime Minister: Christian Homann Schweigaard (April to June)
Prime Minister: Johan Sverdrup

Events
Prime Minister Christian August Selmer is impeached and removed from office.
28 January – The Liberal Party is founded.
10 February – Jon Hol is imprisoned for his pamphlet Rifleringen.
3 April – April ministerium begins.
26 June – Christian Homann Schweigaard's ministerium ends.
Norwegian Association for Women's Rights (Norsk Kvinnesaksforening) is founded.
 Women in Norway are allowed to study.

Arts and literature
The Wild Duck by Henrik Ibsen is written.

Births

January to June

8 January – Nils Andresson Lavik, politician (died 1966)
9 January – Sigge Johannessen, gymnast and Olympic silver medallist (died 1974)
15 January – Anton Aure, bibliographer (died 1924).
24 January – Jens Lunde, politician (died 1974)
9 February – Conrad Carlsrud, gymnast, track and field athlete and Olympic silver medallist (died 1973)
13 February – Halfdan Bjølgerud, high jumper (died 1970)
21 February – Ole Iversen, gymnast and Olympic silver medallist (died 1953)
29 February – Haakon Lie, forester and writer (died 1970).
27 March – Oscar Guttormsen, athlete (died 1964)
31 March – Arne Magnussen, politician
26 April – Sigurd Mathisen, speed skater and world champion (died 1919)
7 June – Birger Ljungberg, politician (died 1967)

July to September
6 July – Thorleif Petersen, gymnast and Olympic gold medallist (died 1958)
10 July – Olav Nygard, poet (died 1924)
26 July – Trygve Pedersen, sailor and Olympic bronze medallist (died 1967)
31 July – Kristian Løken, military officer (died 1961)
23 August – Olaf Syvertsen, gymnast and Olympic silver medallist (died 1964)
31 August – Didrik Arup Seip, linguist and professor (died 1963)
6 September – Sven Elvestad, journalist and author (died 1934)
16 September – Kristian Fjerdingen, gymnast and Olympic gold medallist (died 1975)

October to December
 

17 October – Klara Semb, folklorist (died 1970).
25 October – Eivind Berggrav, Lutheran bishop (died 1959)
12 November – Leif Grøner, banker and politician (died 1971)
13 December – Otto Olsen, rifle shooter and Olympic gold medallist (died 1953)
18 December – Ole Aanderud Larsen, ship designer and businessperson (died 1964)
30 December – Eugen Ingebretsen, gymnast and Olympic gold medallist (died 1949)

Full date unknown
Gustav Berg-Jæger, journalist and Nazi collaborator (died 1957)
Lars Christensen, shipowner and whaling magnate (died 1965)
Sigurd Eriksen, painter (died 1976)
Adolf Indrebø, politician (died 1942)
Lars Knutsen, shipowner (died 1963)
Arnold Rørholt, military officer (died 1961)

Deaths
27 February – Jo Gjende, outdoorsman and freethinker (born 1794)
3 September – Christian Jensen, politician and Minister (born 1823)

Full date unknown
Adolph Frederik Munthe, politician and Minister (born 1817)
Ole Hovelsen Mustad,  businessperson and politician (born 1810)
Frederik Stang, lawyer, public servant and politician, Norway's first Prime Minister (born 1808)

See also

References